Giulio Mangano (born 17 May 1999) is an Italian professional footballer who plays as a goalkeeper for  club Aurora Pro Patria 1919.

Club career
Formed on Inter Milan youth sector, Mangano was loaned to Serie D club Pro Patria, he played 22 matches for the club, who won the 2017–18 Serie D this season.

In 2018 he joined to Pro Patria permanently. On 27 July 2021, he extended his contract until 2023.

Honours
Pro Patria
 Serie D: 2017–18

References

External links
 
 

1999 births
Living people
Sportspeople from Varese
Footballers from Lombardy
Italian footballers
Association football goalkeepers
Serie C players
Inter Milan players
Aurora Pro Patria 1919 players